Loco is a 1984 computer game developed by Antony Crowther and released by Alligata for the Commodore 64.  Loco is a clone of the 1982 Sega arcade game Super Locomotive. Ports for the ZX Spectrum and Atari 8-bit family were released in 1986. The ZX Spectrum port was developed by Richard Stevenson, David Wright and Nigel Speight.. The music for the game is a C64 remake of Jean Michel Jarre's Equinoxe 5 and 6 by Ben Daglish.

Crowther's subsequent Suicide Express is related to Loco, though not an official sequel.

Reception
In July 1984 Loco was awarded game of the month by Personal Computer Games magazine.

References

External links
Loco at Lemon64
Loco at Atari Mania

1984 video games
Atari 8-bit family games
Commodore 64 games
ZX Spectrum games
Video game clones
Video games developed in the United Kingdom
Alligata games